Lepaute is a small lunar impact crater that is located along the western edge of the Palus Epidemiarum, a minor lunar mare in the southwestern part of the Moon's near side. It was named after French astronomer Nicole-Reine Lepaute. To the east is the larger crater Ramsden, within a system of rilles named the Rimae Ramsden. This is an elongated crater feature that is longer in the north–south direction. The outer rim is only slightly worn, and the inner walls are simple slopes that run down to the level, featureless interior floor.

Satellite craters

By convention these features are identified on lunar maps by placing the letter on the side of the crater midpoint that is closest to Lepaute.

References

 
 
 
 
 
 
 
 
 
 
 

Impact craters on the Moon